The Region of Stettin was a unit of territorial division in the Prussian Province of Pomerania, with Prussia forming part of the German Empire from 1871. It was established in 1816 and existed until 1945. On 1 October 1932 the Stralsund Region was incorporated into the Stettin Region. The Region included all of Western and large parts of Central Pomerania.

The seat of the regional president's office (Regierungspräsidium; literally 'Government Presidium') was in the city of Stettin (modern Szczecin). Initially it was located in the Ducal Castle, in 1911 it moved to new premises, now used as the West Pomeranian Voivodeship Office in Poland.

Further reading
 Amtliches Gemeindeverzeichnis für das Deutsche Reich auf Grund der Volkszählung 1919. Herausgegeben vom Statistischen Reichsamt, Stettin 1941

References

History of Pomerania
Government regions of Prussia
1816 establishments in Prussia
States and territories disestablished in 1945
1945 disestablishments in Germany